The Old Tehran gate (Persian: دروازه تهران قدیم), or simply the Tehran Gate (Persian: دروازه تهران), is a historical gate in Qazvin, Iran. It is one of the only 2 remaining city gates of Qazvin, the other being the Darb Kushk Gate.

It is located at the south east entrance of the city, allowing for people who came from Tehran to enter. Thus, it was named the Tehran gate, the gate that is at the direction to Tehran. It was built outside the city, but due to the increase in population of Qazvin it is now within the city. It is listed in Iranian national heritage sites with the number 392.

There used to be a Tehrani counterpart to this gate, named Qazvin gate, that was located at the other end of the Tehran-Qazvin road.

References 

Gates
Buildings and structures in Qazvin Province